Allentown United FC is an American soccer club based in Allentown, Pennsylvania that plays  in NISA Nation Northeast Conference, in the 4th tier of the US soccer pyramid from 2022.

History
Allentown United FC was founded by the young Lehigh Valley native, Emmanuel Ntow-Mensah in 2018 with the goal of supporting the local soccer community with hopes to showcase the talent on a broader regional and national level. The club made its debut on field in 2019 by joining the United Premier Soccer League. In the summer of 2021 Allentown United played in the 2021 NISA Independent Cup.
From 2022 the first team will join NISA Nation.

References

Soccer clubs in Pennsylvania
Association football clubs established in 2018
2018 establishments in Pennsylvania
Sports in Allentown, Pennsylvania
United Premier Soccer League teams